Whitney is an unincorporated community in Menominee County, in the U.S. state of Michigan.

History
A post office was established at Whitney in 1883, and remained in operation until it was discontinued in 1939. The community was named for the owner of a local charcoal kiln.

References

Unincorporated communities in Menominee County, Michigan